Sathyabhaama is a 1963 Indian Malayalam-language film, directed by M. S. Mani and produced by T. E. Vasudevan. The film stars Prem Nazir, Adoor Bhasi, Thikkurissy Sukumaran Nair and C. R. K. Nair. The film had musical score by V. Dakshinamoorthy.

Cast
Prem Nazir 
Adoor Bhasi 
Thikkurissy Sukumaran Nair 
C. R. K. Nair
Ambika 
Baby Padmini 
Kottarakkara Sreedharan Nair 
L. Vijayalakshmi

Soundtrack
The music was composed by V. Dakshinamoorthy and the lyrics were written by Abhayadev.

References

External links
 

1963 films
1960s Malayalam-language films